Durbridge is a surname. Notable people with the surname include:

Don Durbridge (1939–2012), radio presenter
Francis Durbridge (1912–1999), English playwright and author
Luke Durbridge (born 1991), Australian road and track cyclist 

English-language surnames